The National Police Headquarters (KGP) is a central authority of law enforcement in Poland. Its goal is to provide public security and order. It is run by Chief of Police, who is a subordinate to the Polish Minister of Internal Affairs.

The headquarters of the Police Headquarters is located at 148/150 Pulawska Street in Warsaw. The building was built in the Socialist Realism style probably in 1955. It was designed by Jerzy Beill. Previously the Ministry of Internal Affairs was located here. The seat is H-shaped, referring to modern palace architecture. The entrance portico features lotus columns.

Police general commandants
Leszek Lamparski (May 1990-July 1991)
Roman Hula (July 1991-January 1992)
Zenon Smolarek (March 1992-March 1995)
Jerzy Stańczyk (March 1995-January 1997)
Marek Papała (January 1997-January 1998)
Jan Michna (January 1998-October 2001)
Antoni Kowalczyk (October 2001-October 2003)
Leszek Szreder (October 2003-October 2005)
Marek Bieńkowski (October 2005-February 2007)
Konrad Kornatowski (February - August 2007)
Tadeusz Budzik (August 2007 - March 2008)
Andrzej Matejuk (March 2008 - January 2012)
Marek Działoszyński (January 2012 - February 2015)
Krzysztof Gajewski (February 2015 - December 2015)
Zbigniew Maj (December 2015 - February 2016)
Jarosław Szymczyk (since April 2016)

References

External links
Homepage, English variant

National law enforcement agencies of Poland